Saltash railway station serves the town of Saltash in Cornwall, England. It is on the south side of the town between the Royal Albert Bridge which crosses the River Tamar and the Coombe Viaduct which spans a small tributary of the same river. Trains are operated by Great Western Railway. The line singles at the east end of the station passing over the Royal Albert Bridge.

History

The station opened with the Cornwall Railway on 4 May 1859. It was described at the time as being "at the head of that town. It consists of an arrival and departure station, both being stone buildings, and possessing all requisite offices for the accommodation of the traffic. New and convenient approaches are likely to be made to that station by the corporation and the owners of adjoining property, which will prove a great public benefit." A goods shed was opened early in 1863 and the station was rebuilt in 1880–1881.

The Cornwall Railway was amalgamated into the Great Western Railway on 1 July 1889. To counter competition from electric trams, the Great Western Railway opened several small stations in Plymouth and began to operate an intensive service of local trains between Saltash, Plymouth and Plympton in July 1904. The services were vastly reduced after the Tamar road bridge opened in 1961. The Great Western Railway was nationalised into British Rail from 1 January 1948 which was in turn privatised in the 1990s.

Facilities
The station is unstaffed and has no ticket provision, so all tickets must be purchased in advance or from the conductor on the train. Waiting shelters, bicycle racks and bench seats are provided on each side, while train running information is offered via customer help points, timetable posters and a public telephone.  Step-free access is available to both platforms.

In 2017, Saltash Town Council purchased the building, and - working with Cornwall Council, Great Western Railway, Network Rail and the Railway Heritage Trust - restored the building to provide a waiting room, toilets and refreshments, as well as a community hall and business hub, reopening the restored building in November 2021.

Services

On weekdays there are one or two trains each hour in each direction during the daytime but early mornings, in the evenings and on Sundays the service is less frequent.

References

External links

Saltash Rail Users Group

Railway stations in Cornwall
Railway stations in Great Britain opened in 1859
Former Great Western Railway stations
Railway stations served by Great Western Railway
DfT Category F2 stations